Skagly is a 1979 album by jazz musician Freddie Hubbard released on the Columbia label which features performances by Hubbard, Hadley Caliman, Billy Childs, Phil Ranelin on all tracks except "A Summer Knows" with Paulinho da Costa guesting on two tracks and George Duke and  Jeff "Skunk" Baxter guesting on one track.

Track listing
 "Happiness Is Now" - 7:52
 "Theme from Summer of '42" (Alan Bergman, Marilyn Bergman, Michel Legrand) - 5:36
 "Cascais" - 7:44
 "Skagly" - 14:34
 "Rustic Celebration" - 5:35
All compositions by Freddie Hubbard except as indicated
 Recorded at Hollywood Sound Recorders, December, 1979

Personnel
 Freddie Hubbard: trumpet
 Hadley Caliman: tenor saxophone, flute
 Billy Childs: keyboards
 Larry Klein: bass
 Carl Burnett: drums
 Paulinho da Costa: percussion
 Phil Ranelin: trombone (tracks 1,3,4,& 5 )
 George Duke: claves (track 4)
 Jeff "Skunk" Baxter: guitar (track 4)

References

1979 albums
Columbia Records albums
Albums produced by George Butler (record producer)
Freddie Hubbard albums